Marcel Tremblay is the name of:

Marcel Tremblay (Montreal), Union Montreal member of the City Council of Montreal and brother of Mayor Gérald Tremblay
Marcel Tremblay (politician) (born 1943), Progressive Conservative member of the Canadian House of Commons, 1984–1993
Marcel Tremblay (ice hockey) (1915–1980), retired ice hockey player
Marcel Tremblay (speed skater) (born 1965), Canadian Olympic speed skater